Omalodes is a genus of clown beetles in the family Histeridae. There are more than 60 described species in Omalodes.

Species
These 68 species belong to the genus Omalodes:

 Omalodes amazonius Marseul, 1861
 Omalodes angelo Moura, Leivas & Caneparo, 2016
 Omalodes angulatus (Fabricius, 1801)
 Omalodes anthracinus Marseul, 1853
 Omalodes areolatus Schmidt, 1889
 Omalodes atacamanus Leivas & Degallier, 2015
 Omalodes bifoveolatus Marseul, 1853
 Omalodes binodulus (Lewis, 1910)
 Omalodes bisulcatus Desbordes, 1919
 Omalodes brevisternus Schmidt, 1893
 Omalodes bullatus Lewis, 1905
 Omalodes cerqueirae Desbordes, 1919
 Omalodes chapadae Lewis, 1908
 Omalodes clavulus Lewis, 1888
 Omalodes consanguineus Marseul, 1853
 Omalodes depressisternus Marseul, 1853
 Omalodes ebeninus Erichson, 1834
 Omalodes extorris Marseul, 1853
 Omalodes exul Marseul, 1853
 Omalodes fassli Bickhardt, 1911
 Omalodes faustus Erichson, 1834
 Omalodes felix Lewis, 1900
 Omalodes fortunatus Lewis, 1898
 Omalodes foveola Erichson, 1834
 Omalodes gagatinus Erichson, 1847
 Omalodes grossus Marseul, 1853
 Omalodes haitianus Marseul, 1853
 Omalodes humerosus Schmidt, 1889
 Omalodes intermedius (Lewis, 1907)
 Omalodes kovariki Moura, Leivas & Caneparo, 2016
 Omalodes laceratus Marseul, 1853
 Omalodes laevicollis Bickhardt, 1911
 Omalodes laevigatus (Quensel, 1806)
 Omalodes laevinotus Marseul, 1853
 Omalodes lapsans Marseul, 1861
 Omalodes lubricans Casey
 Omalodes lucidus Erichson, 1834
 Omalodes marquisicus Marseul, 1853
 Omalodes marseuli Schmidt, 1889
 Omalodes mazuri Moura & De Almeida, 2013
 Omalodes mendax Marseul, 1861
 Omalodes mestino Lewis, 1904
 Omalodes monilifer Marseul, 1853
 Omalodes novus Marseul, 1853
 Omalodes obliquistrius Lewis, 1908
 Omalodes omega (Kirby, 1818)
 Omalodes optatus Lewis, 1911
 Omalodes perpolitus Schmidt, 1893
 Omalodes planifrons Marseul, 1853
 Omalodes praevius Marseul, 1861
 Omalodes pulvinatus Erichson, 1834
 Omalodes punctistrius Marseul, 1853
 Omalodes punctulatus Moura & De Almeida, 2013
 Omalodes rivus Moura & De Almeida, 2013
 Omalodes ruficlavis Marseul, 1853
 Omalodes serenus Erichson, 1834
 Omalodes seriatus Schmidt, 1889
 Omalodes simplex Lewis, 1908
 Omalodes sinuaticollis Marseul, 1853
 Omalodes sobrinus Erichson, 1834
 Omalodes soulouquii Marseul, 1861
 Omalodes tuberculatus Lewis, 1905
 Omalodes tuberculifer Desbordes, 1917
 Omalodes tuberculipygus Schmidt, 1889
 Omalodes tuberosus Lewis, 1889
 Omalodes vapulo Marseul, 1861
 Omalodes vitreolucens Casey
 Omalodes wagneri Desbordes, 1919

References

Further reading

 
 

Histeridae
Articles created by Qbugbot
Staphyliniformia genera
Taxa named by Wilhelm Ferdinand Erichson